Slim Bouaziz (born 16 April 1950) is a Tunisian chess Grandmaster (1993).

Chess career
From the late 1960s to the early 2000s, Slim Bouaziz was one of the leading Tunisian chess players. He won twice in Arab Chess Championships (1986, 1991).

Slim Bouaziz has participated five times in Interzonal Tournaments of the World Chess Championships:
 In 1967 in Sousse ranked 22nd place;
 In 1979 in Riga ranked 15th place;
 In 1982 in Las Palmas ranked 12th place;
 In 1985 in Tunis withdrew after six rounds, having drawn only one game and lost the rest;
 In 1987 in Szirak ranked 17th place.

In 1999, in Las Vegas Strip he participated in FIDE World Chess Championship 1999, where in first round lost Vasilios Kotronias.

Slim Bouaziz was participant in many international chess tournaments where he won or shared first places in Belgrade (1977) and Bucharest (1992).

Slim Bouaziz represented the Tunisian team in major team chess tournaments:
 in Chess Olympiad participated 16 times (1966-1970, 1974, 1978–1986, 1990–1996, 2000, 2004–2006);
 in World Team Chess Championship participated in 1989;
 in World Student Chess Championship participated 3 times (1963, 1965–1966).

Bouaziz was awarded the FIDE International Master (IM) title in 1975 and became a Grandmaster (GM) in 1993. He was the first African chess player to receive Grandmaster title. In 2014, Bouaziz also became a FIDE International Organizer.

References

External links
 
 
 

1950 births
Living people
Chess grandmasters
Tunisian chess players
Chess Olympiad competitors
Sportspeople from Tunis